Ian Walter Nelson (23 April 1956, Wakefield, Yorkshire, England) – 23 April 2006) was an English new wave musician, and younger brother of Be-Bop Deluxe singer and guitarist Bill Nelson, whom he accompanied in different musical projects. He played mainly the saxophone.

Biography
He was more than seven years younger than his brother , who was present at the time of his birth, on 23 April 1956.  Walter, who was a saxophonist, taught him to play saxophone, which would later be Ian's principal instrument.

His first participation was on the Be-Bop Deluxe song  from the  album (1976).

After  split up,  spent some time collaborating in his brother Bill's solo career. In 1982, he joined Fiat Lux; during his three years with the band they released a number of singles, but only had two minor UK hits, "Secrets" and "Blue Emotion". Fiat Lux gigged England and Europe until they broke up in 1985.

He also worked with Richard Jobson, Level 42, The Sound, Nik Kershaw and Howard Jones among others.

Nelson died in his sleep, and was later found on his 50th birthday, on 23 April 2006, by his wife Diane.

References

External links
Bill Nelson's homepage Bill Nelson announcing the death of Ian Nelson
Bill Nelson's homepage Bill Nelson writing about Ian Nelson
HiredHistory Web dedicated to Fiat Lux
MySpace: Red Noise MySpace site dedicated to Red Noise

1956 births
2006 deaths
English rock keyboardists
English new wave musicians
Place of death missing
English rock saxophonists
British male saxophonists
Musicians from Wakefield
Bill Nelson's Red Noise members
20th-century saxophonists
20th-century British male musicians